Jean Tirole (born 9 August 1953) is a French professor of economics at Toulouse 1 Capitole University. He focuses on industrial organization, game theory, banking and finance, and economics and psychology. In 2014 he was awarded the Nobel Memorial Prize in Economic Sciences for his analysis of market power and regulation.

Education 
Tirole received engineering degrees from the École Polytechnique in Paris in 1976, and from the École nationale des ponts et chaussées in 1978. He graduated as a member of the elite Corps of Bridges, Waters and Forests.  Tirole pursued graduate studies at the Paris Dauphine University and was awarded a DEA degree in 1976 and a Doctorat de troisième cycle in decision mathematics in 1978.  In 1981, he received a Ph.D. in economics from the Massachusetts Institute of Technology for his thesis titled Essays in economic theory, under the supervision of Eric Maskin.

Career 

Tirole is chairman of the board of the Jean-Jacques Laffont Foundation at the Toulouse School of Economics, and scientific director of the Industrial Economics Institute (IDEI) at Toulouse 1 University Capitole. After receiving his doctorate from MIT in 1981, he worked as a researcher at the École nationale des ponts et chaussées until 1984. From 1984–1991, he worked as Professor of Economics at MIT. His work by 1988 helped to define modern industrial organization theory by organising and synthesising the main results of the game-theory revolution vis-à-vis understanding of non-competitive markets.

From 1994 to 1996 he was a professor of economics at the École Polytechnique. Tirole was involved with Jean-Jacques Laffont in the project of creating a new School of Economics in Toulouse. He is Engineer General of the Corps of Bridges, Waters and Forest, serving as Chair of the Board of the Toulouse School of Economics, Visiting Professor at MIT and Professor "cumulant" at the École des hautes études en sciences sociales since 1995.

He was president of the Econometric Society in 1998 and of the European Economic Association in 2001. Around this time, he was able to determine a way to calculate the optimal prices for the regulation of natural monopolies and wrote a number of articles about the regulation of capital markets—with a focus on the differential of control between decentralised lenders and the centralised control of bank management. Tirole has been a member of the Académie des Sciences morales et politiques since 2011, the Conseil d'analyse économique since 2008 and the Conseil stratégique de la recherché since 2013. In the early 2010s, he showed that banks generally tend to take short-term risks and recommended a change in quantitative easing towards a more quality-based market stimulation policy.

Contributions to economics 
Tirole's textbook, The Theory of Industrial Organization, synthesised modern models of oligopolistic competition, analysing various cases where industries consist of a small number of firms with significant market power. He and Oliver Hart published a paper showing the conditions in which a vertical merger can result in foreclosure. Rochet and Tirole analysed the implications of 2-sided markets for competition policy. Fudenberg and Tirole also created a taxonomy of strategic effects in oligopolistic competition models.

Awards 
Tirole was awarded the Nobel Memorial Prize in Economic Sciences in 2014 for his analysis of market power and the regulation of natural monopolies. Tirole received doctorates honoris causa from the Université libre de Bruxelles in 1989, the London Business School and the University of Montreal in 2007, the University of Mannheim in  2011, the Athens University of Economics and Business and the University of Rome Tor Vergata in 2012 as well as the University of Lausanne in 2013.

Tirole also received the inaugural BBVA Foundation Frontiers of Knowledge Award in the Economics, Finance and Management category in 2008, the Public Utility Research Center Distinguished Service Award (University of Florida) in 1997, and the Yrjö Jahnsson Award of the Yrjö Jahnsson Foundation and the European Economic Association in 1993. He is a foreign honorary member of the American Academy of Arts and Sciences (1993) and of the American Economic Association (1993). He has also been a Sloan Fellow (1985) and a Guggenheim Fellow (1988). He was a fellow of the Econometric Society in 1986 and an Economic Theory Fellow (Society for the Advancement of Economic Theory) in 2011. In 2013 Tirole was elected an Honorary Fellow of the Royal Society of Edinburgh.

In 2007 he was awarded the highest award (the Gold Medal or médaille d'or) of the French CNRS. In 2008, he received the Prix du Cercle d'Oc; in 2009, he received an  Outstanding Contributions to the Profession Award (International Association for Energy Economics); in 2010, he was granted the Chicago Mercantile Exchange – Mathematical Sciences Research Institute (CME-MSRI) prize in Innovative Quantitative Innovations in Finance,  the Tjalling Koopmans Asset Award (Tilburg University), and  the "Prix Claude Levi-Strauss". He is among the most influential economists in the world according to IDEAS/RePEc.  Besides his numerous academic distinctions, he was the recipient of the Gold Medal of the city of Toulouse in 2007, a Chevalier de la Légion d'honneur since 2007 and an Officer in the Ordre national du Mérite since 2010.

Publications 
Tirole has published about 200 professional articles in economics and finance, as well as 10 books, including  The Theory of Industrial Organization, Game Theory (with Drew Fudenberg), A Theory of Incentives in Procurement and Regulation (with Jean-Jacques Laffont), The Prudential Regulation of Banks (with Mathias Dewatripont), Competition in Telecommunications (with Jean-Jacques Laffont), Financial Crises, Liquidity, and the International Monetary System, and  The Theory of Corporate Finance. His research covers industrial organization, regulation, game theory, public economics, banking and finance, psychology and economics, international finance and macroeconomics.

Books 
 Dynamic Models of Oligopoly (with D. Fudenberg), 1986.
 The Theory of Industrial Organization, MIT Press, 1988. Description and chapter-preview links.
  Dynamic Models of Oligopoly (avec Drew Fudenberg, Harwood Academic Publishers GMbH, 1986. 
 Game Theory (with D. Fudenberg), MIT Press, 1991.
 A Theory of Incentives in Regulation and Procurement (with J.-J. Laffont), MIT Press,1993. Description & chapter-preview links.
 The Prudential Regulation of Banks (with M. Dewatripont), MIT Press,1994.
 Competition in Telecommunications, MIT Press, 1999.
 Financial Crises, Liquidity and the International Monetary System, Princeton University Press, 2002.
 The Theory of Corporate Finance, Princeton University Press, 2005. Description.  Association of American Publishers 2006 Award for Excellence.
 Balancing the Banks (with Mathias Dewatripont, and Jean-Charles Rochet), Princeton University Press, 2010.
 Inside and Outside Liquidity (with Bengt Holmström), MIT Press, 2011.
 Théorie de l'organisation industrielle, Economica, 2015 
 Économie du bien commun, Presses universitaires de France, 2016
 Economics for the common good, Princeton University Press; 2017

References

External links 
 Personal info and curriculum vitae on the IDEI website
  Bibliography
 Biography
 BBVA Foundation Frontiers of Knowledge Awards 
 Econ Focus interview, Federal Reserve Bank of Richmond, Fourth Quarter 2017
 

|-

1953 births
Living people
People from Troyes
Nobel laureates in Economics
Corporate finance theorists
Financial economists
Game theorists
Information economists
Chevaliers of the Légion d'honneur
French Nobel laureates
Members of the Académie des sciences morales et politiques
Foreign associates of the National Academy of Sciences
Fellows of the American Academy of Arts and Sciences
Fellows of the Royal Society of Edinburgh
Sloan Fellows
Fellows of the Econometric Society
Presidents of the Econometric Society
MIT School of Humanities, Arts, and Social Sciences alumni
École Polytechnique alumni
Corps des ponts
Paris Dauphine University alumni
Academic staff of École Polytechnique
Academic staff of the Toulouse School of Economics
Officers of the Ordre national du Mérite
Labor economists
20th-century French economists
21st-century French economists
Nancy L. Schwartz Memorial Lecture speakers
Fellows of the European Economic Association